The Iraqi National Symphony Orchestra began as the Baghdad Symphony Orchestra in 1944. It performed for approximately two years and was disbanded after Albert Chaffoo left Iraq and returned to London to continue his musical career. Many members of the former Baghdad Symphony later formed the future Iraqi National Symphony The orchestra became officially known as the Iraqi National Symphony in 1959 when it began to receive a salary from the government.  The INSO was abolished by the Iraqi Minister of Culture in 1962 and rehearsed underground until 1970, when it was re-established. 

Over the next ten years, the Orchestra toured France, Spain, Algeria, Lebanon and Jordan, and hosted guest musicians and conductors from many countries. But during the 1980s and 1990s many musicians, plagued by financial hardship, left the country to pursue opportunities elsewhere.  Although its home theater was burned by looters during the April 2003 invasion of Baghdad, the orchestra performed a concert in Baghdad in June 2003 and subsequently traveled through northern Iraq, recruiting new members. 

In December 2003, the orchestra performed a joint concert with the U.S. National Symphony Orchestra and Yo-Yo Ma at the Kennedy Center in Washington, co-sponsored by the U.S. State Department.  President George W. Bush and First lady Laura Bush attended the concert, and Colin Powell introduced the orchestra.

The INSO is currently managed and conducted by Karim Wasfi.

Members

Representative of the diversity of Iraq, its 90+ musicians now include Shi'a, Sunni, Kurds, Turkoman, Armenians and Christians, as well as six women, one of whom is the first American woman to join in the history of the orchestra. Due to rising sectarian divisions in Iraq some musicians sit away from each other at rehearsals.

Famous attendees
Aida Nadeem

References 

  (audio)
  (video)

External links 

 CultureConnect photographs from the Kennedy Center concert
 National Symphony/Iraqi National Symphony Orchestra Joint Concert, December 9, 2003, Matthew Guilford, member of the U.S. National Symphony
 The Sweet, Sweet Sound of…What, Exactly?: The Iraqi National Symphony Orchestra Goes to Washington , Anastasia Tsioulcas

Iraqi musical groups
Iraqi orchestras
National orchestras
Musical groups established in 1944
1944 establishments in Iraq